The Styx is a river in Greek mythology that formed the boundary between Earth and the Underworld.

Styx River or River Styx may also refer to:

Geography

Municipalities 
River Styx, Ohio, a community in Medina County, Ohio

Rivers

Australia 
 Styx River (East Central Queensland)
 Styx River (New South Wales)
 Styx River (Tasmania)
 Styx River (West Central Queensland)

New Zealand
Styx River (Canterbury)
Styx River (North Canterbury)
Styx River (West Coast)
Styx Creek, in Otago

Russia
Styx (Perm)

United States
Styx River (Alabama)
River Styx (Georgia)
River Styx, a semi-subterranean stream in Mammoth Cave National Park, Kentucky
River Styx (Gratiot County, Michigan)
River Styx (Marquette County, Michigan)
Styx River (Ohio)
River Styx, the subterranean portion of Cave Creek in Oregon Caves National Monument and Preserve
Styx Branch, a stream in Tennessee

Arts, entertainment, and media
 "River Styx", a song by Black Rebel Motorcycle Club from Beat the Devil's Tattoo
 River Styx, the Nile River in Robert E. Howard's fictional Hyborian Age
 River Styx Magazine, a magazine based in St Louis, Missouri
 River Styxx, a character in the Monster High franchise
 The River Styx (painting) or La Laguna Estigia, a painting by Felix Resurreccion Hidalgo

Other 
River Styx archaeological site, in Alachua County, Florida

See also
 Styx (disambiguation)